Linda Secondary School is a government school in Livingstone, Zambia. It was established in 1963. The school is also known for winning the 2016 Copa Coca-Cola football tournament in Zambia.

References

External links 
 Official Website 
 Official Facebook Page

Educational institutions established in 1963
Education in Livingstone, Zambia
Schools in Livingstone
Secondary schools in Zambia
Livingstone, Zambia
Southern Province, Zambia
1963 establishments in Northern Rhodesia